Keskitalo is a Finnish surname. Notable people with the surname include:

 Sinikka Keskitalo (1951–2011), Finnish long-distance runner
 Petri Keskitalo (born 1967), Finnish decathlete
 Aili Keskitalo (born 1968), Norwegian Sami politician
 Miro Keskitalo (born 1996), Finnish ice hockey defenceman

Finnish-language surnames